The 1979–80 Ohio State Buckeyes men's basketball team represented Ohio State University as a member of the Big Ten Conference during the 1979–80 NCAA Division I men's basketball season. Led by 4th-year head coach Eldon Miller, the Buckeyes played their home games at St. John Arena in Columbus, Ohio.

With a loaded roster that had five future NBA players, Ohio State spent all but one week of the season ranked in the AP top ten. The Buckeyes went into the regular season finale tied with Indiana in the conference standings, but fell to the Hoosiers on the road in overtime. Likely under-seeded, the team received a bid to the NCAA tournament as No. 4 seed in the West region. After handling No. 5 seed Arizona State in the round of 32, the Buckeyes were upset in the Sweet Sixteen by No. 8 seed and eventual Final Four participant UCLA, 72–68.

Ohio State finished with a record of 21–8 (12–6 Big Ten). Senior guard Kelvin Ransey was named a Consensus second-team All-American and was selected as the No. 4 pick in the 1980 NBA draft.

Roster

Schedule/results

|-
!colspan=9 style=| Non-Conference Regular season

|-
!colspan=9 style=| Big Ten Regular season

|-
!colspan=9 style=|NCAA Tournament

Rankings

References

Ohio State Buckeyes men's basketball seasons
Ohio State
Ohio State